Bala Junction railway station was on the Ruabon to Barmouth line in southern Gwynedd, Wales. It closed to passengers on Monday 18 January 1965. Bala Junction was unusual in that it was inaccessible by road and merely served as an interchange station; it was located about ¾ mile to the south-east of the town of Bala.

The station was at the junction with the Blaenau Ffestiniog branch. It was built as a crossing point for trains on the Bala Ffestiniog and Ruabon Barmouth lines, and featured three platforms with a small waiting room and signalbox on a central island platform. There was also a cast-iron GWR water tank.

History

Opened by the Great Western Railway, it remained in that company through the Grouping of 1923. The station passed to the Western Region of British Railways on nationalisation in 1948. Passenger services to Bala and on the Ruabon-Barmouth line ceased in January 1965; the service beyond Bala to Blaenau Festiniog having been withdrawn in 1960.

During its operational life, Bala Junction served as an interchange station for the branch line train to Blaenau Festiniog, usually operated by small tank locomotives such as the 6400 Class 0-6-0PT and 5800 Class 0-4-2T tank locomotives. These trains did not run beyond Bala Junction, instead returning north to the GWR station at Blaenau Festiniog. There were no goods facilities here either; all goods trains stopped to shunt detached wagons for the branch line train.

As a junction station, Bala Junction was equipped with standard GWR lower quadrant semaphore signals to control train movements between the Bala Ffestiniog and Ruabon-Barmouth lines. These were used particularly when the branch line train was shunting in preparation for its return to Blaenau Festiniog as there were no turning facilities here. To run around, the branch line engine had to cross from Platform 3 (the Bala Ffestiniog platform) onto the main line and run back along Platform 2, used by eastbound trains running to Ruabon.

As of 2014, the only remnants at Bala Junction are the trackbeds of the Bala Ffestiniog and Ruabon-Barmouth lines and the platform faces. The site is close to a nearby dam; part of the access road for this uses the formation of the Bala Ffestiniog line, passing close to the remains of a short bridge that carried the line into Bala Junction itself.

Neighbouring stations

References

Sources

Further reading

External links
 The station site on a navigable OS Map, via National Library of Scotland
 The station on a navigable 1953 OS map, via npe Maps
 The station and line, via Rail Map Online
 The line LJT2 with mileages, via Railway Codes
 The line RUA with mileages, via Railway Codes
 Bala and Dollgellau Railway, via Railscot
 Bala and Festiniog Line, via Railscot
 Corwen and Bala Railway, via Railscot
 Remisinscences by a local railwayman, via Forgotten Relics
 Images of the station, via Yahoo
 Driver's view north of Bala to Blaenau, via YouTube
 Train leaving Bala station, via alamy
 Several photos of the Blaenau line, via Penmorfa
 Several photos of the Blaenau line, via Penmorfa
 A special on the Blaenau line, via 2D53
 1960 Working timetable, via 2D53
 Details of Summer 1989 excursions through the station, via Six Bells Junction
 Deatails and photos of 22 Jan 1961 railtour, via Six Bells Junction
 The 1961 last train special, via YouTube
 An inspection saloon ride on the line, Part 1, via YouTube
 An inspection saloon ride on the line, Part 2, via YouTube
 Signal box diagram, via Signalling Record Society

Disused railway stations in Gwynedd
Beeching closures in Wales
Railway stations in Great Britain opened in 1882
Railway stations in Great Britain closed in 1965
Former Great Western Railway stations
Rail junctions in Wales
Llangywer
Bala, Gwynedd